Simphiwe Brian Shabangu (born 16 May 2013) is a South African rugby union player who last played for the  in the Currie Cup and in the Rugby Challenge. His regular position is flanker.

Career

Youth and Varsity rugby

Shabangu came through the  youth system, playing for their Under–16 team at the 2004 Grant Khomo Week, for the Under–18s at the 2005 Academy Week and for the Under–21 team in the 2008 Under-21 Provincial Championship.

Border Bulldogs

Shabangu only played in two 2013 Vodacom Cup matches due to his Varsity Cup duties, but returned to the Bulldogs make a further ten appearances in the 2013 Currie Cup First Division, scoring two tries.

Pumas

He was a member of the Pumas side that won the Vodacom Cup for the first time in 2015, beating  24–7 in the final. Shabangu made nine appearances during the season, scoring two tries.

Sevens and Representative rugby

Shabangu also played some sevens rugby, playing for the  sevens team in 2009 and 2010 and captaining a South African Emerging Sevens team in the Safaricom Sevens tournament in 2011.

In 2013, Shabangu was included in a South Africa President's XV team that played in the 2013 IRB Tbilisi Cup and won the tournament after winning all three matches.

References

1988 births
Living people
Border Bulldogs players
Rugby union players from Durban
South African rugby union players
University of South Africa alumni
Rugby union flankers